Marcel Vaid (born 1967) is a Swiss-German musician (guitar) and composer of music for film and theatre.

Life and career 
Born in Erlangen, Germany, Marcel Vaid's father is of Punjabi origin from India. Besides his work as a composer and music producer, he composes music for fiction and documentary films. Marcel Vaid is together with his brother Ravi Vaid also the head of the electro-acoustic experimental collective Superterz.

Marcel Vaid's most important goal is to develop an individual language, an individual and discreet soundscape for every film. In the foreground is the motto "less is more". To this day he produced music for over 90 feature films. An outstanding sound-aesthetical concern is the examination of acoustical instruments and their stereoscopic processing in the computer.

For this he collaborates with artists such as Nils Petter Molvær, Toshinori Kondo, Kate Havnevik, Mauro Pawlowski, Rodrigo González, Norbert Möslang, Marianne Schroeder, Lauren Newton and Jojo Mayer. In film Marcel Vaid has worked a.o. with director Léa Pool, Eliza Kubarska, Fredi Murer, Marcus Vetter, Milo Rau, Oliver Paulus, Tommaso Landucci or oscar-nominated Timo von Gunten.

Marcel Vaid has been hounoured a number of times. To this day he received four times the Swiss Film Prize Quartz (Zara 2009, Goodnight Nobody 2011, When the sun fell 2016 and Chris the Swiss 2019), the Prix Fondation Suisa (Tandoori Love 2009), the prize for Best Film Score at the Filmfstivals in Angers (Joshua 2003) and Valencia (Where is Max 2009). In 2012 he received the Zurich City Award (Werkjahr der Stadt Zürich).

Marcel Vaid gives diverse masterclasses and is working as a guest lecturer at the Zurich University of the Arts. He is a member of the Swiss and European Filmacademy and president of the Swiss Media Composers Association.

Filmography (selected work)

Feature films 
 2002 Joshua by Andreas Müller
 2003 At Parish by Yaël Parish
 2006 First Love, Last Rites by Susanne Kaelin
 2007 The Illettrist by Oliver Paulus, Stefan Hillebrand
 2008 Zara by Ayten Mutlu Saray
 2008 Der Freund, in collaboration with Sophie Hunger, by Micha Lewinsky
 2008 Tandoori Love by Oliver Paulus
 2008 Un día y nada by Lorenz Merz
 2008 Wo ist Max? by Juri Steinhart
 2009 Die Standesbeamtin, in collaboration with Markus Schönholzer, by Micha Lewinsky
 2010 Bon Appétit by David Pinillos
 2010 Sommervögel by Paul Riniker
 2012 Poupée by Timo Von Gunten
 2012 Dreamgirl by Oliver Schwarz
 2013 Cherry Pie by Lorenz Merz
 2013 Sitting Next To Zoe by Ivana Lalovic
 2013 Vielen Dank für Nichts, in collaboration with Rodrigo González, by Oliver Paulus, Stefan Hillebrand
 2014 Controlling And Punishment by Ayten Mutlu Saray, Ridha Tlili
 2014 Now or Never by Fredi Murer
 2015 Köpek by Esen Isik
 2015 Usfahrt Oerlike by Paul Riniker
 2017 La Fuga by Sandra Vannucchi (replaced Theo Teardo)
 2017 Lasst die Alten sterben by Juri Steinhart (new composer)
 2018 Level Up Your Life, in collaboration with Jochen Doc Wenz, by Oliver Paulus, Stefan Hillebrand
 2019 Al-Shafaq – When Heaven Divides by Esen Isik
 2020 Eating the Silence by Joël Louis Jent, Ali Al-Fatlawi
 2020 Of Fish and Men by Stefanie Klemm
 2021 The Sphere by Manuel Šumberac
 2022 Semret by Caterina Mona

Documentary films 
 2009 Dachkantine by Nicole Biermaier, Ravi Vaid
 2010 Guru – Bhagwan, His Secretary & His Bodyguard by Sabine Gisiger, Beat Häner
 2010 Goodnight Nobody by Jacqueline Zünd
 2010 Hüllen by Maria Müller
 2011 Das Geheimnis unseres Waldes by Heikko Böhm
 2011 Marc Ristori d'une seconde à l'autre by Benjamin Tobler
 2011 The Substance – Albert Hoffmans LSD by Martin Witz
 2012 Bernard Bovet, le vieil homme à la caméra by Nasser Bakhti
 2012 Forbidden Voices by Barbara Miller
 2013 My Name Is Salt by Farida Pacha
 2013 The Green Serpent by Benny Jaberg
 2014 El tiempo nublado by Arami Ullón
 2014 ThuleTuvalu by Matthias von Gunten
 2015 Als die Sonne vom Himmel fiel by Aya Domenig
 2016 Staatenlos, in collaboration with André Bellmont, by Erich Schmid
 2017 The Kongo Tribunal by Milo Rau
 2017 Double Sentence by Léa Pool
 2018 Chris the Swiss by Anja Kofmel
 2019 The Forum by Marcus Vetter
 2019 Golden Age by Beat Oswald, Samuel Weniger
 2019 Gateways to New York – Othmar H. Ammann and His Bridges by Martin Witz
 2020 The Wall of Shadows by Eliza Kubarska
 2020 Not Me – A Journey with Not Vital by Pascal Hofmann
 2020 Unter einem Dach by Maria Müller
 2021 Ostrov – Lost Island by Svetlana Rodina, Laurent Stoop
 2021 Caveman – The Hidden Giant by Tommaso Landucci
 2022 Dear Memories by Nahuel Lopez
 2022 Do you remember me by Desirée Pomper, Helena Müller

Television 
 2004 Das Paar im Kahn by Marie-Louise Bless
 2004 Voyage contre la faim by Matthias von Gunten
 2006 Flanke ins All by Marie-Louise Bless
 2011 Vater, unser Wille geschehe by Robert Ralston Jr.
 2015 Undine Gruenter - Le projet d'aimer by Anita Hugi
 2015 Au coeur des Robots by Bruno Victor-Pujubet
 2017 My unknown Russia by Roger Brunner, Lisa Röösli, Dave Leins
 2018 My unknown America by Roger Brunner, Lisa Röösli, Dave Leins, Beat Häner
 2019 Dynastie Knie – 100 Years Nationalcircus by Greg Zglinski
 2020 Ursus & Nadeschkin – Aufhören wäre einfach by Stefan Jäger
 2020 My other China by Roger Brunner, Lisa Röösli, Dave Leins, Beat Häner
 2021 Stille über Fukushima by Aya Domenig
 2021 Il demolitore di camper by Robert Ralston Jr.
 2021 The Pianist who came in from the cold – Sergey Tanin by Helen Stehli Pfister
 2022 Tatort – Schattenkinder by Christine Repond
 2022 Tatort – Risiken mit Nebenwirkungen by Christine Repond

Awards 
 2003 Winner Prix de la Création musicale, European First Film Festival, Angers  in Joshua 
 2009 Winner Swiss Filmprize Quartz Best Filmscore in Zara 
 2009 Winner Best Filmmusic, Filmfestival La Cabina, Valencia, in Wo ist Max?
 2009 Winner Best Filmmusic Prix Fondation Suisa at the Internationalen Filmfestival Locarno in Tandoori Love
 2011 Nomination Best Filmscore at the 12th International Filmfestival Aubagne, in Goodnight Nobody
 2011 Winner Swiss Filmprize Quartz Best Filmscore in Goodnight Nobody
 2012 Winner Werkjahr der Stadt Zürich Jazz/Rock/Pop, shared with Ravi Vaid
 2016 Winner Swiss Filmprize Quartz Best Filmscore in Als die Sonne vom Himmel fiel
 2018 Nomination Swiss Filmprize Quartz Best Filmscore in The Kongo Tribunal
 2018 Nomination Cristal Pine Award Best Original Score in a Documentary in Chris the Swiss
 2018 Nomination European Animation Award Best Soundtrack in a Feature Film in Chris the Swiss
 2018 Nomination German Documentary Filmmusik Award 'Best original Score' in Chris the Swiss
 2019 Winner Swiss Filmprize Quartz Best Filmscore in Chris the Swiss
 2019 Nomination Swiss Filmprize Quartz Best Filmscore in

References

External links 
 
 
 Interview with Marcel Vaid in Cinebulletin 2021
 Review Neue Zürcher Zeitung new album Superterz Inland Empire, 3CD Box
 Marcel Vaid at Swissfilms - Nationale Filmdatenbank
 Marcel Vaid at Crew United

Swiss film score composers
Male film score composers
Swiss composers
Swiss male composers
Swiss guitarists
Living people
1967 births
Swiss people of Indian descent
Musicians from Zürich